Afrodacus is a subgenus of tephritid or fruit flies in the family Tephritidae.

References

Bactrocera
Insect subgenera